Gillingham Town Football Club is a football club based in Gillingham, Dorset, England. The club also has a reserve side and a women's side.

History
The club was established on 14 November 1879 at the Phoenix Hotel. A successful period starting in the mid-1960s saw them win the Dorset League four times in five season. In 1970 they moved up to the Dorset Combination. The club finished bottom of the league in 1983–84, but avoided being relegated. In 2001–02 they won the League Cup, beating Westland Sports 2–1 in the final. They were league runners-up the following season, the first after the league was renamed the Dorset Premier League. After finishing as runners-up again in 2007–08, the club were promoted to Division One of the Western League.

In 2009–10 Gillingham won the Dorset Senior Cup, beating Wimborne Town 2–1 in the final after extra time. A third-place finish in Division One in 2011–12 saw the club promoted to the Premier Division. Despite finishing ninth in the Premier Division in 2016–17, the club resigned from the Western League and dropped back into the Dorset Premier League to concentrate on building their new ground. In 2021 they were promoted back to Division One of the Western League.

Ground
During the late 19th century and early 20th century the club played at Chantry Fields. After World War I they relocated to a pitch on School Road, now a playing field. The club later moved to Hardings Lane after it was vacated by the Gillingham Show Society. A new clubhouse was built in 1977, and in 2005 floodlights were erected and hard standing laid on all sides of the pitch. In 2018 the club moved to a new ground on Woodwater Lane located a couple of hundred yards down the road, but still use Hardings Lane.

Honours
Dorset Senior Cup
Winners 2009–10
Dorset Premier League
League Cup winners 2001–02

Records
Best FA Cup performance: Second qualifying round, 2009–10, 2012–13
Best FA Vase performance: Second round, 2007–08, 2016–17

See also
Gillingham Town F.C. managers

References

External links
Official website

Football clubs in England
Football clubs in Dorset
1879 establishments in England
Association football clubs established in 1879
Dorset Football League
Dorset Premier Football League
Western Football League
Gillingham, Dorset